Zabava još traje is the first live album by the Serbian garage rock/punk rock band Partibrejkers, released by Sorabia Disk in 1992.

Track listing

Personnel 
Partibrejkers
 Nebojša Antonijević "Anton" — guitar
 Zoran Kostić "Cane" — vocals
 Borko Petrović — drums
 Dime Todorov "Mune" — bass guitar

Additional personnel
 Igor Borojević — photography
 K.a.m.e.n.k.o. — engineer

References 

1992 live albums
Partibrejkers live albums